Zhuhai Jinwan Airport , also called Zhuhai Sanzao Airport before January 10, 2013, is the airport serving the city of Zhuhai in Guangdong province, China.

Zhuhai airport serves Chinese domestic flights but no international flights. The airport hosts the largest airshow in mainland China, the China International Aviation & Aerospace Exhibition.

History 

The airport began construction in December 1992 and opened in June 1995. One year later in 1996, the first China International Aviation & Aerospace Exhibition was hosted at the airport.

In October 2006, the airport officially began to co-operate with the nearby Hong Kong International Airport, forming the operator company Hong Kong-Zhuhai Airport Management Co.,Ltd.

Future Expansion 

In September 2017, the CAAC and the government of Guangdong province announced an expansion plan of Zhuhai airport, including expansion of the eastern corridor, the third and fourth floor of the terminal and the western VIP lounge. The plan started in November 2017 and was completed on February 9 2018.

A new terminal and a  runway is also planned. The new terminal started construction in November 2019 and is expected to be completed by June 2023.

Airlines and destinations

Passengers

Cargo

Transport

Airport express 

There are four airport express routes connecting the airport and Zhuhai city centre, mainly serve major hotels and city lounges in Xiangzhou, Gongbei, Jida and Tangjiawan. Some routes connect stations of Guangzhou-Zhuhai intercity railway (including Zhuhai railway station), Jiuzhou Port (major ferry terminal with frequent passenger ships to Hong Kong) and Gongbei Port.

Other intercity lines connect hotels, city lounges or bus terminals of Macau, Zhongshan and Jiangmen with the airport.

Public transport 

The airport is also served by the Zhuhai city bus network through routes 207 (to the Gongbei Port of Entry and Zhuhai Railway Station), 504 (to Jing'an in the Doumen District) and 701 (to Sanzao town proper).

The airport has its exclusive taxi company to transport the arrivals to everywhere.

The airport will have its own Zhuhai Airport Railway Station linked with the Guangzhou–Zhuhai intercity railway. This spur line is 
under construction.

Statistics

See also 

 List of airports in China
 List of the busiest airports in China

References

External links 

Airports in Guangdong
Buildings and structures in Zhuhai
1995 establishments in China
Airports established in 1995